Beware of Blondie is a 1950 American black and white comedy film and is the last of Columbia's 28 Blondie films in 12 years.

Plot summary
Mr. Dithers goes on vacation, and leaves Dagwood in charge of the office.  He arrives exhausted, having worked late on his tax return and being awakened by garbage collectors. Dagwood is recognized the next day taking an attractive female business client to lunch at a French restaurant.  Blondie learns of this, is jealous, and insists that Dagwood start eating only from a lunchbox.  However, remembering Mr. Dithers' insistence that he land the business contract, Dagwood takes the client out a second time, and follows her to her apartment afterward where she tries to seduce him.  Blondie finally exposes the woman as a dangerous swindler.

Cast
 Penny Singleton as Blondie
 Arthur Lake as Dagwood
 Larry Simms as Baby Dumpling
 Marjorie Ann Mutchie as Cookie
 Daisy as Daisy the Dog
 Adele Jergens as Toby Clifton
 Dick Wessel as Policeman
 Jack Rice as Ollie Shaw
 Alyn Lockwood as Mary
 Emory Parnell as Herb Woodley
 Isabel Withers as Harriet Woodley
 Danny Mummert as Alvin Fuddle
 Douglas Fowley as Adolph
 William E. Green as Samuel P. Dutton
 Edward Earle as Mr. J.C. Dithers (uncredited)

References

External links
 
 
 
 

1950 films
Columbia Pictures films
American black-and-white films
Blondie (film series) films
1950 comedy films
American comedy films
1950s English-language films
Films directed by Edward Bernds
1950s American films